Events in the year 1967 in Norway.

Incumbents
 Monarch – Olav V
 Prime Minister – Per Borten (Centre Party)

Events

 1 January – The Norwegian National Insurance Act (Folketrygdloven) was introduced.
 22 October – The opening of the Tjeldsund Bridge.
 24 November – The voting age in Norway was set to 20 years of age.
 Municipal and county elections are held throughout the country.
 The Government Pension Fund of Norway (Norwegian: Statens pensjonsfond Norge or SPN) was established by the Norwegian National Insurance Act (Folketrygdloven)
Natur og Ungdom is established.

Popular culture

Sports
11 to 12 February – The World Allround Speed Skating Championships for Men are held in Oslo.

Music

Film

Literature
Per Hansson, journalist and writer, is awarded the Gyldendal's Endowment literature prize.
Hallvard Rieber-Mohn, writer and Dominican priest, is awarded the Riksmål Society Literature Prize.
Astrid Tollefsen, poet, is awarded the Norwegian Critics Prize for Literature for the poetry collection Hendelser.
Johan Borgen is awarded the Nordic Council Literature Prize, for the short story collection Nye noveller.

Notable births

January 
  
1 January – Trude Brænne Larssen, novelist
5 January – Kjetil Skogrand, historian and politician.
10 January – Jan Åge Fjørtoft, footballer.
12 January (in Sweden) – Vendela Kirsebom, model and actress 
12 January – Stig Kleven, sport wrestler.
14 January (in Sweden) – Rolf Gupta, composer and conductor.
20 January – Ivar Bern, chess player
21 January – Geir Waage, politician
28 January – Dag-Eilev Fagermo, footballer
30 January – Pål Christian Roland, health administrator and politician.

February 
  
 
1 February 
 John Hegre, guitarist, songwriter and sound engineer
 Kjetil Storesletten, economist 
3 February 
 Gisle Kverndokk, composer.
 Børge Petersen-Øverleir, guitarist
4 February – Trond-Arne Bredesen, Nordic combined skier.
8 February 
 Kent Bergersen, footballer
 Lise Davidsen, soprano.
12 February – Stein Inge Brækhus, jazz musician.
15 February – Trond Egil Soltvedt, footballer
16 February – Hanne Hogness, handball player.
18 February – Nina Sandberg, politician.
21 February – Marianne Aasen, politician.
22 February – Audun Erlien, jazz musician
26 February – Audun Skorgen, jazz musician

March 
 
 
7 March 
 Helje Solberg, journalist.
 Knut Yrvin, software developer
9 March 
 Siri Broch Johansen, Sami author, singer, and textbook writer.
 Per Espen Stoknes, politician.
11 March 
 Ole Einar Martinsen, footballer 
 Liv Gustavsen, politician.
 Håkon Storm-Mathisen, jazz musician
13 March – Tone-Helen Toften, politician.
18 March – Kjetil Bjørklund, politician.
19 March – Frode Scheie, handball player.
22 March – Brage Sandmoen, football referee
27 March – Sølvi Olsen Meinseth, athlete.
31 March – Ivar Kolve, jazz musician

April 
 
 
3 April – Berit Digre, handball player.
4 April – Siv Mossleth, politician.
5 April – Erland Johnsen, footballer
6 April – Eirin Kristin Sund, politician.
8 April – Margit Bakken, musician 
14 April – Frode Unneland, musician
17 April – Kenneth Blom, painter (born in Denmark).
19 April 
 Bodil Arnesen, operatic soprano.
 Tine Sundtoft, civil servant and politician.
20 April – Frode Thomassen, footballer
21 April – Knut Erling Granaas, sledge hockey goaltender
24 April – Magnus Grønneberg, singer
26 April – Alf Kåre Tveit, footballer
27 April 
 Dag Stokke, musician (d. 2011)
 Hege Stendahl, cyclist.
 Bjørnar Valstad, orienteering competitor

May 
 
 
6 May – Heidi Grande Røys, politician.
12 May – Espen Berntsen, football referee
15 May – Simen Agdestein, chess player.
19 May 
 Rannveig Andresen, politician.
 Ingjerd Egeberg, actress and theatre director.
 Morten Tyldum, film director.
23 May – John Krogstie, computer scientist 
24 May – Morten Finstad, ice hockey player.
25 May – Knut Holte, footballer
26 May – Bjørn Petter Ingebretsen, footballer
27 May – Kristen Skjeldal, cross-country skier.
28 May – Hanne Vataker, sport shooter.
29 May – Brynjar Meling, lawyer.

June 
  
 
 
1 June – Endre Brunstad, linguist 
3 June – Stein Morten Lier, crime fiction writer.
4 June 
 Knut Frostad, competitive sailor.
 Terje Sørvik, politician.
 Runar Steinstad, Paralympian athlete
8 June (in Sweden) – Amy Jönsson Raaholt, tennis player
13 June – Sunniva Ørstavik, civil servant.
17 June – Cato Tom Andersen, ice hockey player.
18 June – Berit Opheim, singer.
19 June – Bjørn Dæhlie, cross-country skier and businessman.
20 June 
 Regina Alexandrova, politician.
 Grunde Njøs, speed skater.
22 June – Morten Wold, politician.
26 June – Laila Thorsen, politician.
27 June – Runar Søgaard, management coach
28 June – Anne Rygh Pedersen, politician.
29 June – Johann Roppen, educator
30 June – Sture Fladmark, footballer
30 June (in Sweden) – Lars Vågberg, curler.

July 
 
 
 
1 July – Karin Nordstad, politician.
2 July 
 John Christian Elden, barrister and politician.
 Torgeir Larsen, diplomat and politician
3 July – Lisbet Rugtvedt, politician.
3 July – Sindre Ekrheim, poet.
4 July – Stig Rasch, handball player
10 July – Morten Kræmer, footballer 
11 July 
 Trygve Allister Diesen, TV and film director, producer and screenwriter 
 Bent-Ove Pedersen, tennis player
19 July 
 Wegard Harsvik, politician.
 Tom Johansen, ice hockey player.
20 July – Per J. Jordal, jurist and politician 
25 July – Tommy Skjerven, football referee
26 July – Gunn Karin Gjul, politician.
27 July 
 Hans-Christian Gabrielsen, politician and trade unionist.
 Hans Mathisen, jazz guitarist

August 
1 August 
 Hugo Hansen, footballer
 Vibeke Karlsen, football referee.
7 August – Gunnar Fosseng, handball player
11 August – Petter Wettre, jazz musician.
12 August – Anne Marie Halvorsen, sport wrestler.
17 August – Hilde Strømsvold, footballer
22 August – Merete Agerbak-Jensen, politician.
28 August – Solrun Flatås, cyclist.
29 August – Jon Almaas, television presenter and writer.
29 August (in Iceland) – Jon Stephenson von Tetzchner, programmer and businessman 
31 August – Anita Moen, cross-country skier.

September 
 
1 September – Carl Gunnar Gundersen, ice hockey player.
5 September – Sturla Berg-Johansen, stand-up comedian, imitator, actor and television host
9 September (in Australia) – Bjarne Melgaard, artist.
14 September – Jens Lien, film director.
20 September – Pål Jackman, film director and musician. 
23 September – Cathrine Roll-Matthiesen, handball player.

October 
 
 
2 October – Petter Belsvik, footballer.
6 October – Svend Karlsen, strongman, powerlifter, and IFBB professional bodybuilder
9 October – Ola Elvestuen, politician.
11 October 
 Minna Nystedt, speed skater.
 Erik Pedersen, footballer
12 October – Frode Olsen, footballer.
20 October 
 Petter Schjerven, television host
 Kjersti Toppe, politician.
24 October – Lisbeth Bakken, footballer.

November 
4 November – Jørn Hurum, paleontologist.
10 November – Kårstein Eidem Løvaas, politician (born in the US)
17 November – Mons Ivar Mjelde, footballer 
30 November 
 Arild Andresen, film director
 Bent Ånund Ramsfjell, curler.

December 
3 December – Sjur Robert Nilsen, ice hockey player
12 December – Ingrid Steen, handball player.
14 December 
 Hanne Haugland, high jumper.
 Anne Ryg, actress
15 December – André Flem, footballer
17 December – Ingjerd Thon Hagaseth, politician.
19 December – Stig Traavik, civil servant and diplomat.
21 December – Tonje Skinnarland, military officer.
23 December – Irene Nordli, sculptor
28 December – Trond Helgesen, footballer
29 November – Ole Gustav Gjekstad, handball player and coach.

Full date missing
April – Paal Kibsgaard, petroleum engineer and businessman
Helge Blakkisrud, political scientist
Herman Cappelen, philosopher
Remi Eriksen, businessman
Steinar Haugli, sport shooter
Erik W. Jakobsen, business economist
Linda Johansen, magazine editor and businesswoman 
Thor Alex Kappfjell, offshore worker and BASE jumper (d. 1999).
Javed Kurd, music producer
Johannes W. Løvhaug, historian
Jelena Porsanger, Sami ethnographer (born in the Soviet Union)
Petter S. Rosenlund, dramatist 
Oddrun Samdal, academic
Pål Thonstad Sandvik, historian 
Kjetil Ulven, ski orienteer
Cecilie Cottis Østreng, poet

Notable deaths
  
 
  

3 January – H. O. Bergqvist, engineer, businessman and politician (b. 1889)
12 January – Per Øisang, journalist and radio and television presenter (b.1920)
21 January – Halfdan Magnus Mustad, businessman (b. 1874).
27 January – Christian A. R. Christensen, newspaper editor (b. 1906).
28 January – Leonhard Seppala, sled dog breeder, trainer and musher (b. 1877).
29 January – Gunnar Ousland, writer, editor and politician for the Labour Party(b.1877).
31 January – Peder Nikolai Leier Jacobsen, politician (b.1888).
10 February – Harald Warholm, politician (b.1920).
13 February – Edvin Alten, judge (b.1876).
15 February – Rasmus Sørnes, inventor, clockmaker and radio technician (b.1893).
16 February – Amund Rydland, stage and film actor and theatre director (b. 1888).
25 February – Olaf Willums, painter and printmaker (b. 1886).
26 or 27 February – Thor Solberg, aviation pioneer (b. 1893).
28 February – Kaare Strøm, limnologist (b.1902).
3 March – Mons Lid, politician and Minister (b.1896).
3 March – Jan Petersen, archaeologist (b. 1887).
8 March – Asbjørn Lindboe, politician (b. 1889).
16 March – Jakob Sande, writer, poet and folk singer (b.1906).
20 March – Anders Bjørgaard, illustrator (b. 1891).
23 March – Lalla Carlsen, singer and actress (b. 1889).
2 April – Richard Peterson, tennis player (b. 1884).
5 April – Johan Falkberget, author (b.1879).
14 April – Bertha Bele, politician (b. 1893).
20 April – Birger Ljungberg, politician and minister (b.1884).
2 May – Paul Martin Dahlø, politician (b.1885).
5 May – Hans Amundsen, journalist and politician (b. 1885).
14 May – Jens Isak de Lange Kobro, politician and Minister (b.1882).
22 May – Knut Gysler, equestrian (b. 1888).
24 May – Dagfinn Dahl, barrister (b. 1887).
26 May – Astri Welhaven Heiberg, painter (b. 1881).
7 June – Finn Schiander, sailor (b. 1889).
9 June – Gunnar Neels-Hansson, theatre director (b. 1883).
10 June – Halvard Angaard, sport shooter (b. 1898).
11 June – Johan Sigurd Karlsen, politician (b.1894).
15 June – H. Chr. J. Borchgrevink, engineer and politician (b. 1891).
16 June – Ragnar Vold, journalist (b. 1906).
20 June – Hans Oskar Evju, politician (b.1886).
23 June – Otto Lous Mohr, medical doctor (b. 1886).
11 July – Martin Tranmæl, socialist leader (b.1879).
25 July – Anton Marius Jenssen, merchant and politician (b. 1879).
26 July – Arne Ording, historian and politician (b. 1898).
2 August – Haavard Martinsen, chemist and industrial leader (b. 1879).
11 August – Olav Moe, fiddler (b. 1872).
13 August – Trygve Pedersen, sailor and Olympic bronze medallist (b.1884).
16 August – Arthur Omre, novelist and writer of short stories (b. 1887).
16 August – Marguerite Thoresen, ballet dancer and choreographer (b. 1908).
18 August – Ivar Bae, politician (b.1896).
27 August – Herman Sotaaen, track and field athlete (b. 1888).
28 August – Nils Langhelle, politician and Minister (b.1907).
5 September – Thorleif Dahl, philologist and businessman (b. 1891).
5 September – Alfred Maurstad, actor, movie director and theatre manager (b. 1896).
15 September – Hannibal Fegth, rower (b. 1879).
17 September – Sven Thaulow, sport swimmer (b. 1905).
19 September – Andreas Hagelund, gymnast and Olympic gold medallist (b.1881).
6 October – Sigurd Moen, speed skater and Olympic bronze medallist (b.1897).
8 October – Johan Schreiner, historian (b. 1903).
15 October – Ejnar Tønsager, rower (b.1888).
20 October – Sverre Iversen, trade unionist, civil servant and politician (b. 1879).
21 October – Fridtjof Mjøen, actor and theatre director (born 1897).
29 October – Roy Mikkelsen, a Norwegian born, American Olympic ski jumper (b. 1907).
2 November – Leif Rode, competitive rower, jurist, sports official, poet and playwright (b. 1885). 
5 November – Erling Johnson, chemical engineer (b. 1893)
21 November – Gunvald Bøe, archivist and historian (b. 1903/1904)
26 November – Johannes Hanssen, bandmaster, composer and teacher (b.1874).
1 December – Elen Christensen, sculptor (b. 1904). 
2 December – Johannes Andersen, long-distance runner (b.1888).
7 December – Daniel Johansen, track and field athlete (b.1885).
9 December – Ragnar Solberg, poet (b. 1898). 
12 December – Alf Larsen, poet, essayist and magazine editor (b. 1885).
22 December – Wilhelm Faye, military officer and war historian (b. 1881).
30 December – Kjell Gjøstein Aabrek, politician (b.1901).

Full date missing
Erling Tambs, writer and sailor (b. 1888)
Harry Ivarson, film director and screenwriter (b. 1892)

See also

References

External links